Edward W. Quinn (died September 30, 1931) was involved in the politics of Cambridge, Massachusetts and was the mayor from 1918-1930. He lived in Middlesex County during the early part of the 20th century. In 1912, he was the Superintendent of the Streets under Mayor J. Edward Barry. In 1918, he was the Democratic candidate for mayor, and he held office for 12 years. In 1919, he set up a rent and housing committee as a way to give tenants a place to vent their grievances with rent profiteering. Quinn died on September 30, 1931 of heart disease.

References 

Mayors of Cambridge, Massachusetts